Kompakt: Total 1 or Total 1 was released on 30 July 1999. The album is the first installment of the influential Cologne-based microhouse label's annual compilation of vinyl releases and exclusives from its biggest artists and most promising newcomers. Vinyl and CD editions are quite different since only six songs are included on both formats. All tracks on the vinyl edition are previously unreleased.

Track listing : Vinyl Edition 
A1 Dettinger – "Infarkt" (5:09)

A2 Reinhard Voigt – "Tod Eines Hippiemädchens" (4:29)

A3 T.Raumschmiere – "Ost-Strom" (5:30)

B1 Salz – "Salz 2.1" (5:24)

B2 Andreas Oster – "Surf´s Up" (6:11)

C1 Jürgen Paape – "How Great Thou Art" (5:31)

C2 Tobin – "Reis 1" (4:15)

C3 Mathias Schaffhäuser – "Some Kind Of" (6:01)

D1 Super-8 – "Episode 1" (6:24)

D2 Thomas/Mayer – "Total Confusion" (6:43)

Tracks B2, C2, D1 and D2  are exclusive to vinyl version.

Track listing : CD Edition 
 Jürgen Paape – "How Great Thou Art" (5:31)
 Salz – "Salz 2.1" (5:24)
 Benjamin Wild – "Kronberg" (6:20)
 Schaeben & Voss – "Dicht Dran" (4:26)
 M. Mayer – "17 & 4" (6:38)
 T.Raumschmiere – "Ost-Strom" (5:30)
 Dettinger – "Infarkt" (5:09)
 Reinhard Voigt – "Tod Eines Hippiemädchens" (4:29)
 Joachim Spieth – "Abi '99" (4:18)
 Jürgen Paape – "Triumph" (6:04)
 Mathias Schaffhäuser – "Some Kind Of" (6:01)
 M. Mayer – "Heaven" (6:17)
 Dettinger – "Blond" (6:19)

Seven of the tracks on the CD are taken from previously released 12 inch vinyls originally released on Kompakt or sub-labels (catalogue number in parentheses): #3 (KOM8); #4 (KOM7); #5 (KOM4); #9 (KOM5); #10 (KOM1); #12 (nta015); #13 (KOM2).

External links

1999 compilation albums
Kompakt compilation albums
Microhouse albums
Record label compilation albums